"How to Be a Country Star" is a song recorded by American country music group The Statler Brothers, written by group members Harold Reid and Don Reid.  The song – a humorous, tongue-in-cheek advice song that names many of the top country music recording artists of the time, along with a number of classic country artists – was released in March 1979 as the first single from the album The Originals.  The song eventually climbed to No. 7 on the Billboard Hot Country Singles chart that May, and also No. 18 on the Canadian RPM country singles chart.

Names of artists
As mentioned in the lyrics, directly or indirectly referred to, the song mentions the following country music artists, in order:

 Verse 1: Waylon Jennings, Jerry Reed, Jean Shepard, Tom T. Hall, Merle Haggard, Johnny Rodriguez and Bill Anderson.
 Verse 2: Ronnie Milsap, Mickey Gilley, Jerry Lee Lewis, Roy Acuff, Ralph Emery, Conway Twitty, Buck Owens and Webb Pierce.
 Verse 3: Sonny James, Minnie Pearl, Little Jimmy Dickens, Earl Scruggs, Willie Nelson, Mel Tillis, Roy Clark, Barbara Mandrell, Eddy Arnold and Charley Pride.
 Verse 4: Dolly Parton and Crystal Gayle.

The final verse also name drops each one of the Statler Brothers, whose membership at the time included Harold Reid, Don Reid, Phil Balsley and Lew DeWitt.

The song itself gives intended-to-be-taken-lightly advice about what it takes to be a country star, suggesting that if an aspiring star has a quality of one of the mentioned stars (such as being able to play piano like Ronnie Milsap, Mickey Gilley or Jerry Lee Lewis), that would guarantee country stardom. However, if no talent is apparent (as mentioned in the final verse), any beautiful woman could come backstage and meet up with one of the Statlers for advice and audition for their "Statler Brothers Revue."

Chart performance

References

List songs
Cultural depictions of country musicians
1979 singles
The Statler Brothers songs
Mercury Records singles
Songs written by Don Reid (singer)
Songs written by Harold Reid
Song recordings produced by Jerry Kennedy
1978 songs